The Yountville Hills are a mountain range in Napa County, California on the northwest side of the town of Yountville.  The West Napa Fault extends into the Yountville Hills, as mapped in 2005.

References 

Mountain ranges of Napa County, California
Hills of California
Napa Valley
Yountville, California
California Coast Ranges
Mountain ranges of Northern California